Klonowice  is a village in the administrative district of Gmina Czersk, within Chojnice County, Pomeranian Voivodeship, in northern Poland.

There is archaeological station of Łódź University in the village.

For details of the history of the region, see History of Pomerania.

The village has a population of 9.

References

Klonowice